Gordon Fraser may refer to:

Gord Fraser (cyclist) (born 1968), Canadian road bicycle racer
Gord Fraser (ice hockey) (1902–1966), Canadian professional hockey player
Gordon Fraser (publisher) (1911–1981), British publisher
Gordon Fraser (actor) (born 1976), Scottish actor
Gordon Fraser (politician) (1891–1960), Canadian Member of Parliament
Gordon Fraser (footballer) (born 1943), Scottish footballer